Henry Davey "Harry" Bell (14 October 1924 – 22 April 2014) was an English professional footballer, born in Castletown, County Durham, who made more than 400 appearances in the Football League playing as a wing half for Middlesbrough and Darlington. He went on to manage Spennymoor United, taking the club from the first qualifying round of the 1963–64 FA Amateur Cup to the fourth round proper. Bell had a long cricket career with Durham County Cricket Club playing in the Minor Counties Championship.

His nephew Norman Bell played professional football for Wolverhampton Wanderers and Blackburn Rovers in the 1970s and 1980s.

References

External links
 

1924 births
2014 deaths
Footballers from Sunderland
English footballers
Association football wing halves
Hylton Colliery Welfare F.C. players
Middlesbrough F.C. players
Darlington F.C. players
Spennymoor United F.C. players
English Football League players
English football managers
English cricketers
Durham cricketers